This is a list of television films produced for the cable network Hallmark Channel from 2000 to 2015 including its early years corresponding to the 2000–2007 period. Such films are currently called Hallmark Channel Original Movies.

Hallmark Channel: The early years
 The films listed between January 2000 and July 2001 were aired by the Hallmark Channel's predecessor, Odyssey Network. It was in the year 2000 that the uninterrupted stream of original holiday movies began. Both Hallmark Channel and Odyssey Network have been run by their parent company Crown Media. Hallmark Movie Channel, which launched in January 2004, showcased movies and miniseries for the next four years that already premiered on Hallmark Channel, Hallmark Hall of Fame and other third-party sources. Furthermore, this new and evolving sister channel would not receive measured TV ratings until 2008.

2000

2001

2002

2003

2004

2005

2006

2007

Hallmark Channel: 2008–2015

2008

2009

2010

Hallmark Channel

Hallmark Movie Channel

2011

Hallmark Channel

Hallmark Movie Channel

2012

Hallmark Channel 

 (CtC) Countdown to Christmas is a seasonal programming block.

Hallmark Movie Channel 

 Simultaneous premiere on HC and HMC.

2013

Hallmark Channel 

 (CtC) Countdown to Christmas is a seasonal programming block.

Hallmark Movie Channel

2014

Hallmark Channel

(CtC) Countdown to Christmas is a seasonal programming block.

Hallmark Movies & Mysteries

2015

Hallmark Channel

(CtVD) Countdown to Valentine's Day, (JW) June Weddings, (FH) Fall Harvest, and (CtC) Countdown to Christmas are seasonal programming blocks.

Hallmark Movies & Mysteries

(TMWMoC) The Most Wonderful Movies of Christmas is a seasonal programming block.

See also
 List of Hallmark Hall of Fame episodes (and Category)
 List of programs broadcast by Hallmark Channel (and Category)
 List of Hallmark Channel Original Movies

References

External links
 Hallmark Channel

Hallmark